Anacithara perfecta is a species of sea snail, a marine gastropod mollusk in the family Horaiclavidae.

Description
The length of the dark white, fusiform shell attains 3.5 mm.

Distribution
This marine species occurs off Hawaii

References

External links
  Tucker, J.K. 2004 Catalog of recent and fossil turrids (Mollusca: Gastropoda). Zootaxa 682:1–1295.
 

perfecta
Gastropods described in 1979